XHCRIS-FM is a radio station in San Cristóbal de las Casas, Chiapas, Mexico. Known as Veritas Radio 90.7 FM, XHCRIS is owned by Veritas Medios Global, a civil association that promotes culture and human values.

History
The station launched in November 2012; the station's studio was blessed by Catholic bishop Felipe Arizmendi Esquivel upon its inauguration.

References

Radio stations in Chiapas
San Cristóbal de las Casas